The Ghost of Bragehus (Swedish: Spöket på Bragehus) is a 1936 Swedish comedy film  directed by Ragnar Arvedson and Tancred Ibsen and starring Adolf Jahr, Annalisa Ericson and Tollie Zellman. The film's sets were designed by the art director Manne Runsten.

Synopsis
Adrienne has inherited the ramshackle Bragehus Castle, and she is courted by Einar. This annoys  her aunts who have lived at the castle for many years and they decide to scare him away by pretending to be ghosts.

Cast
 Adolf Jahr as 	Einar Hård
 Annalisa Ericson as 	Adrienne Brage
 Tollie Zellman as 	Agate Brage
 Britta Estelle as 	Young Agate Brage
 Gerda Björne as 	Beat-Sophie Brage
 Märtha Lindlöf as 	Constance Brage
 Eric Abrahamsson as 	Eriksson
 Einar Axelsson as 	Arnell
 Olof Sandborg as 	Dyhlén
 Hugo Björne as 	Joachim Brage
 John Ericsson as 	Befallningsman
 Anders Frithiof as Rik bonde
 Torsten Hillberg as 	Rik bonde
 Erik Johansson as 	Dräng
 Siri Olson as 	Maid
 Ragnar Widestedt as 	Landsfiskalen

References

Bibliography 
 Larsson, Mariah & Marklund, Anders. Swedish Film: An Introduction and Reader. Nordic Academic Press, 2010.

External links 
 

1936 films
Swedish comedy films
1936 comedy films
1930s Swedish-language films
Films directed by Ragnar Arvedson
Films directed by Tancred Ibsen
Swedish black-and-white films
1930s Swedish films